Song Cheol-ho (born 26 May 1949) is a South Korean lawyer and politician and currently serves as the mayor of Ulsan.

Life
Song Cheol-ho was born in Busan in 1949 and he grew up in Iksan, North Jeolla Province, where his father was born.

Song passed the bar exam in 1982 and became a lawyer.

His brother is Song Jung-ho, who served as justice minister in 2002. Like his brother, he joined the government in 2005.

Song was although he lost eight elections, he was elected mayor of Ulsan in 2018.

References

External links
 Official Website

1949 births
Living people
Minjoo Party of Korea politicians
People from Busan
Provincial governors of South Korea